Bahiana is an album by Dizzy Gillespie recorded in 1975 and released on the Pablo label.

Reception
The Allmusic review called the album "one of Dizzy Gillespie's finest albums of the decade... Those wanting to explore Dizzy Gillespie's Latin side should start here".

Track listing
All compositions by Dizzy Gillespie except as indicated
 "Carnival" - 8:02 
 "Samba" (Mike Longo) - 9:41 
 "Barcelona" (Al Gafa) - 12:24 
 "In the Land of the Living Dead" (Gafa) - 10:34 
 "Behind the Moonbeam" (Gafa) - 7:35 
 "The Truth" (Longo) - 8:27 
 "Pele" (Gafa) - 7:15 
 "Olinga" - 20:00

Personnel
Dizzy Gillespie - trumpet
Roger Glenn - flute, bass flute, vibraphone
Al Gafa, Michael Howell - guitar
Earl May - bass
Mickey Roker - drums 
Paulinho Da Costa - percussion

References 

Pablo Records albums
Dizzy Gillespie albums
Albums produced by Norman Granz
1976 albums